Kongsberg Spacetec AS or KSPT or Spacetec A/S, is a supplier of space ground systems and services and is apart of Kongsberg Defence & Aerospace's Space & Surveillance division. The department of ground stations is based in Tromsø, Norway. The company is co-located with Kongsberg Satellite Services (KSAT) and Tromsø Satellite Station (TSS).

History
The company was established by some of the most experienced employees of Tromsø Satellite Station, which had been operating since 1967. They originally established Drive Electronics in 1982, but it was bankrupt two years later. The company was re-established as Spacetec, which was registered on 11 December 1984. The company was established with a share capital of NOK 5 million or NOK 1,000 per share. Along with Norsk Data, Computas, Informasjonskontroll and Noratom, Spacetec established the joint venture Norspace to act as supplier to the European Space Agency. By 1986, the company had eighteen employees. It received a state subsidy of NOK 6.25 million to finance its expansion.

This resulted in a contract to deliver a ground station system to Esrange in Kiruna, Sweden. The Norwegian Defence Research Establishment developed an application of synthetic-aperture radar for satellites at this was to be commercialized by Spacetec and Norsk Data. In July 1988, the company signed a contract to deliver equipment worth NOK 26 million to TSS in partnership with Norsk Data. This involved Spacetec designing a downlink and image processing software for ERS-1 which needed to be capable of handling 100 megabits per second. The new ground station was to be completed in 1989 and operational by April 1990. Also in 1988, Norspace signed an agreement to deliver telemetry components for ESA's Columbus module for the International Space Station. In December Spacetec signed an agreement with ESA to develop a system to transfer satellite data from magnetic tapes to optical discs.

During 1989, Spacetec participated in a cooperation with TSS and the University of Tromsø in developing technology to send satellite images to customers in the course of minutes, rather than hours and days, through the use of broadband. After ten years of development, the Norwegian Defence Research Establishment launched its CESAR supercomputer, which was tailor-made for analysis of SAR images and had been developed in cooperation with Spacetec. It allowed for the analysis of a  surface area in eight minutes. In November 1990, Spacetec signed an agreement with ESA to develop and supply a simulator to test and verify the launching ramp of the Ariane 5 rockets. Spacetec cooperated with the Norwegian Meteorological Institute to develop a processing system for the latter to utilize satellite data for meteorology. With two years of development, Spacetec planned to sell the technology to other users. In 1993, Spacetec signed an agreement with ESA to deliver telemetry systems to ERS-2.

In 1991, the company had 38 employees, of which 30 were engineers. It had a revenue of NOK 28 million and a net income of NOK 2.9 million. One sixth of the company was owned by various employees, while the remaining was owned by various industrial companies in Tromsø. The largest were Odd Berg Gruppen (29 percent) and Sparebanken Nord-Norge (18 percent). Norsk Forsvarsteknologi (NFT) made an unsuccessful attempt to purchase Spacetec in December 1993, with a price of NOK 1300 per share. Negotiations with the main shareholders followed and by March NFT had bought the company at a price of NOK 1,550 per share, NOK 7.75 million in total.

In August 1994, Spacetect signed a contract for parts of a new ground station in Singapore. In September 1995, Spacetec started a cooperation with the French company Thomson to develop systems for the European Organisation for the Exploitation of Meteorological Satellites. In November, a subsidiary was established which would work with processing medical X-ray images. Spacetec participated with technology for the Solar and Heliospheric Observatory.

In 1996, the Norwegian Space Center started negotiations with NASA to provide a ground station for the Earth Observing System (EOS) in Longyearbyen. Svalbard Satellite Station was established in 1997 and was owned by Kongsberg/Lockheed Martin Space Data Services, a joint venture between Kongsberg Spacetec and Lockheed Martin. That year Kongsberg Spacetec had a revenue of NOK 42 million and they announced that they would focus on receiving contracts in Asia and South America. Throughout the 1990s, Kongsberg Spacetec had a fairly stable revenue and an annual profit of between NOK 2 and 3 million. In 1997, Kongsberg moved ten employees working on a radar system to Tromsø and co-located them with Spacetec. Spacetec experienced a major revenue increase from 1999 to 2002, to more than NOK 60 million. However, they were not able to increase their profits. After three years development of new weather satellite technology, Spacetec won a contract worth NOK 50 million in September 2002 for Meteosat 8.

In 2002, ownership and operations of the facility were consolidated and taken over by the newly created Kongsberg Satellite Services. Lockheed Martin was no longer interested in owning a share of the facility, and sold their shares. NSC and Kongsberg merged their interests in the new company, which also took over Tromsø Satellite Station. In April 2005, the company was for the first time in its history forced to lay off employees. The company cited a combination of reduced activity in ESA, a delay in the Meteosat program and a reduction in discounted wage taxes. Nine people were laid off. Following this, there surfaced that there periodically had been poor cooperation between Spacetec and KSAT, as the latter had been in a period with rapid growth without the other following suit. Spacetec had its break-through with NASA in September 2006, when it signed an agreement to deliver twenty-two ground stations to Goddard Space Flight Center in a contract worth NOK 19 million.

Spacetec signed its first contract with a Russian organization in April 2007, when a contract for a ground station for Meteosat was signed with Hydrometeorological Centre of Russia with options for a further two stations. Tromsø Centre for Remote Technology was established in February 2008 as a cooperation between Spacetec, KSAT, UiT and the Northern Research Institute. The goal of the project was to create closer ties between research and commercial activity within satellite communication technology.

Supplier of the framework for the portal BarentsWatch. The agreement was signed in September 2011.

Customers
 European Space Agency (ESA)
 EUMETSAT
 RADARSAT-2 processor (MDA)
 Envisat ASAR processor 
 NASA Goddard Space Flight Center
 Norwegian Meteorological Institute 
 Planck – Low Frequency Instrument
 UK Met Office
 KSAT
 GlobICE project
 Chinese Academy of Science
 Norwegian Computing Center
 KNMI
 NORUT IT
 The ESA/ESRIN ATSR Browse Generation System (ABS)
 ICEMON
 EuroClim
 BarentsWatch

References

Bibliography
 
 
 

Telecommunications companies of Norway
Earth stations in Norway
Space program of Norway
Computer companies of Norway
Defence companies of Norway
Electronics companies of Norway
Information technology consulting firms of Norway
Software companies of Norway
Synthetic aperture radar
Telecommunications companies established in 1984
Technology companies established in 1984
1984 establishments in Norway
Companies based in Tromsø
Companies based in Troms
Spacetec